Zargaran-e Sofla (also Romanized as Zargarān-e Soflá; also known as Zargarān-e Pā’īn) is a village in Chalanchulan Rural District, Silakhor District, Dorud County, Lorestan Province, Iran. At the 2006 census, its population was 249, in 58 families.

References 

Towns and villages in Dorud County